Tankki täyteen (literal translation "Filling the Tank") is a Finnish sitcom television series produced by Yle. The series was written by Neil Hardwick and Jussi Tuominen and was directed by Esko Leimu together with Neil Hardwick. It was one of the most watched and re-broadcast Finnish television comedy series of the 1980s. It was first shown on Yle TV2 between 1978 and 1980. The first production season (1978) comprised six episodes and the second (1980) five episodes.

Premise
The centerpiece of the series is Emilia and Sulo Vilén's (Sylvi Salonen and Tauno Karvonen) gas station, which is hardly visited by customers, as there is no longer access to the service station from the new bypass. Vilén's adult son Juhana (Ilmari Saarelainen), as well as the unmarried bar assistant Ulla (Tuire Salenius), the priest (Erkki Siltola) and the regular guest, the village constable Artturi Reinikainen (Tenho Saurén) are among the key figures in the series. Constable Reinikainen was actually so popular that he later got his own title series, Reinikainen, which was the first spin-off series on Finnish television. Tuominen has characterized Juhana Vilén as a common alter ego between him and Hardwick.

Location
The filling station in the series's exterior pictures was the Kesoil service station, which was demolished in the late 1980s and was located in the center of Ylöjärvi, west of the junction of the Vaasantie and Kuruntie roads, about 100 meters from the Kuruntie bridge towards Vaasa. During the filming of the series, a Kale family lived in the bar section of the service station, with the workshop stable on the workshop side. An apartment building has been built on the site. The service station had been completed in 1960 for the Autori service station chain in the Tampere and Pori regions and switched to Kesoil in 1964.

Episodes

Re-broadcasts
Even today, the series enjoys strong cult following in Finland. The latest rerun of the series was shown on TV2 in the spring of 2020, when all episodes of the series were shown. The theater version of the series, compiled from episodes 1–6, was presented at the Orimattila local summer theater, which premiered on July 4, 2008. In summer 2009 and 2010, Kauhajoki's Teatteri Kajo also performed the first production season spiced with music and in 2012 the second production season. The musical version by Teatteri Eurooppa Neljä premiered at the Sappee Summer Theater in Pälkäne on June 15, 2011.

Home releases
 Huoltamo halvalla (episodes 1–6) VHS (2001)
 Yrittänyttä ei laiteta – halvalla (episodes 7–11) VHS (2002)
 Kaikki halvalla (all episodes) DVD (2002)

See also
List of Finnish television series

References

External links
 

1978 Finnish television series debuts
1980s Finnish television series endings
Finnish comedy television series
1970s sitcoms
Yle original programming
1980s sitcoms